JoAnne Gunderson Carner (born April 4, 1939) is an American former professional golfer. Her 43 victories on the LPGA Tour led to her induction in the World Golf Hall of Fame. She is the only woman to have won the U.S. Girls' Junior, U.S. Women's Amateur, and U.S. Women's Open titles, and was the first person ever to win three different USGA championship events. Tiger Woods is the only man to have won the equivalent three USGA titles. Arnold Palmer, Jack Nicklaus, and Carol Semple Thompson have also won three different USGA titles.

Carner was inducted into the Rhode Island Heritage Hall of Fame in 1969. In 1981, Carner was voted the Bob Jones Award, the highest honor given by the United States Golf Association in recognition of distinguished sportsmanship in golf. She captained the 1994 U.S. Solheim Cup team.

Amateur career
Born in Kirkland, Washington, a suburb east of Seattle, "The Great Gundy" (as she was known before she married Don Carner) remained an amateur until age 30.  In 1960, while attending Arizona State University, she won the national intercollegiate individual golf championship. From 1956 to 1968, she was the dominant woman in amateur golf, and accumulated five U.S. Women's Amateur titles (1957, 1960, 1962, 1966, 1968), ranking her second only to Glenna Collett Vare who had six. She was runner-up two other times (1956, 1964). In 1966, Carner needed 5 extra holes (41 holes in total) to beat Marlene Stewart Streit in the longest final match in U.S. Women's Amateur history. She also won the U.S. Girls' Junior in 1956.

While still an amateur in 1969, Carner won an LPGA Tour event, the Burdine's Invitational. She was the last amateur to win on the LPGA Tour until 15-year-old New Zealander Lydia Ko won the CN Canadian Women's Open in 2012.

Professional career
Carner's greatest professional victories were her two U.S. Women's Opens, in 1971 and 1976. She led after each round in 1971 and won easily, finishing seven shots better than Kathy Whitworth who finished in second. In 1976, Carner needed an 18-hole playoff to defeat Sandra Palmer.

Big Mama (her other nickname) was the second player in LPGA history to cross the $1 million mark in career earnings. She had an unusually long career, remaining competitive through the late 1990s. During 2004, she still played 10 tournaments and became the oldest player to make a cut on the LPGA Tour at age 65.

On July 29 and 30, 2021, Carner played in the U.S. Senior Women's Open at Brooklawn Country Club in Fairfield, Connecticut and shot her age (82) in the first round, and bettered that by shooting 79 in the second round. Although she did not make the cut, she became the fifth golfer ever to shoot their age or better multiple times in a USGA championship while also being the oldest golfer ever to play in a USGA championship.

Personal
Carner is a graduate of Arizona State University, where she was a member of Kappa Alpha Theta. She married Don Carner in 1963, and he also served as her coach and business manager. They were married 36 years until his death at age 83 in 1999 after a long illness. The couple was known for driving from tournament to tournament and staying in an Airstream trailer.

Amateur wins (7)
1956 U.S. Girls' Junior
1957 U.S. Women's Amateur
1959 Women's Western Amateur
1960 U.S. Women's Amateur
1962 U.S. Women's Amateur
1966 U.S. Women's Amateur
1968 U.S. Women's Amateur

Professional wins (49)

LPGA Tour wins (43)

Carner won the Burdine's Invitational as an amateur.
Note: Carner won the Peter Jackson Classic (which became the du Maurier Classic) twice before it became a major championship.

LPGA Tour playoff record (10–10)

Other wins (6)
1975 Wills Qantas Australian Ladies Open
1977 LPGA National Team Championship (with Judy Rankin)
1978 Colgate Triple Crown Match-Play Championship
1979 Colgate Triple Crown
1982 JCPenney Mixed Team Classic (with John Mahaffey)
1996 Sprint Titleholders Senior Challenge

Major championships

Wins (2)

1 In an 18-hole playoff, Carner 76, Palmer 78.

Results timeline

† The Kraft Nabisco Championship was the Nabisco Dinah Shore Championship through 1999. It became the Nabisco Championship in 2000 and adopted the Kraft Nabisco Championship name in 2002.
^The Women's British Open replaced the du Maurier Classic as an LPGA major in 2001.

CUT = missed the half-way cut
DQ = disqualified
... = not yet a major
"T" = tied for place

Summary

Most consecutive cuts made – 37 (1962 U.S. Women's Open – 1985 Nabisco Dinah Shore)
Longest streak of top-10s – 24 (1974 LPGA – 1984 Nabisco Dinah Shore)

Team appearances
Amateur
Curtis Cup (representing the United States): 1958 (tie), 1960 (winners), 1962 (winners), 1964 (winners)

Professional
Handa Cup (representing the United States): 2006 (winners), 2007 (winners), 2008 (winners), 2009 (winners), 2010 (winners), 2011 (winners)
Solheim Cup (representing the United States): 1994 (non-playing captain, winners)

See also
List of golfers with most LPGA Tour wins

References

External links

American female golfers
LPGA Tour golfers
Winners of ladies' major amateur golf championships
Winners of LPGA major golf championships
World Golf Hall of Fame inductees
Golfers from Washington (state)
Sportspeople from Kirkland, Washington
1939 births
Living people
21st-century American women